Lucian Arye Bebchuk (born 1955) is a professor at Harvard Law School focusing on economics and finance.

Bebchuck has a B.A. in mathematics and economics from the University of Haifa (1977), an LL.B. from the University of Tel Aviv (1979), an LL.M. and S.J.D. from Harvard Law School (1980 and 1984) and an M.A. and Ph.D. in economics, also from Harvard (1992 and 1993). He was a junior fellow of the Harvard Society of Fellows from 1983 to 1985. He joined the Harvard Law faculty in 1986. Bebchuck is the co-author, with Jesse Fried, of Pay without Performance: The Unfulfilled Promise of Executive Compensation.

Distinctions
Prof. Bebchuk was named one of the top 100 most influential players in corporate governance in the US by Directorship magazine. He was elected a fellow of the American Academy of Arts and Sciences in 2000. In 2004, he was awarded a Guggenheim Fellowship.

References

External links
Personal website
Faculty page

1955 births
Living people
Fellows of the American Academy of Arts and Sciences
Harvard Law School alumni
Harvard Law School faculty
Tel Aviv University alumni
Finance law scholars
University of Haifa alumni
American legal scholars